Ang Laren, or Ang Larencuo, is a salt lake in Zhongba County in the Shigatse Prefecture of the Tibet Autonomous Region of China. It is located northwest of Renqingxiubu Lake and contains at least 4 islands, the largest of which is about 10 kilometres in length.

References

Shigatse
Lakes of Tibet